Barkly Pass is situated in the high mountains of the Eastern Cape, South Africa, on the Regional R58 tarred road between Elliot and Barkly East.

The pass is subject to frequent winter snow closures. The pass is named after Henry Barkly, governor of the Cape.

References

Mountain passes of the Eastern Cape